Mülayim Erdem  (born January 10, 1987 in Istanbul, Turkey) is a Turkish footballer, who currently plays for Vefa SK.

Career
A midfielder, Erdem currently plays on loan for Gaziantep Büyükşehir Belediyespor. He is a product of the Galatasaray Youth Team.

Mülayim is also the nephew of the former Galatasaray player, Arif Erdem.

References

External links
Profile at TFF.org 

1987 births
Living people
Turkish footballers
Turkey youth international footballers
Galatasaray S.K. footballers
İstanbul Başakşehir F.K. players
Orduspor footballers
Yalovaspor footballers

Association football midfielders